Henry Austin Brucklacher (April 12, 1898 – January 7, 1941) was an American football guard who played three seasons with the Louisville Brecks of the National Football League. His name is sometimes misspelled as "Brunklacher".

References

External links
Just Sports Stats
Fanbase profile

1898 births
1941 deaths
American football offensive guards
Louisville Brecks players